Saccharopolyspora cebuensis is a bacterium from the genus Saccharopolyspora which has been isolated from the marine sponge Haliclona on Cebu in the Philippines.

References

 

Pseudonocardineae
Bacteria described in 2008